John Murray, 4th Duke of Atholl, KT, PC, FRS (30 June 1755 – 29 September 1830), styled Marquess of Tullibardine from 1764 to 1774, was a Scottish peer.

Life and career

Murray was the eldest son of John Murray, 3rd Duke of Atholl, and his wife, Charlotte, 8th Baroness Strange, daughter of James Murray, 2nd Duke of Atholl. Lord George Murray and Lord Charles Murray-Aynsley were his younger brothers. He became known by the courtesy title Marquess of Tullibardine when his father succeeded to the dukedom in 1764.

Murray succeeded his father as fourth Duke of Atholl in 1774 and was elected a Scottish Representative Peer. In 1786 he was created Baron Murray, of Stanley in the County of Gloucester, and Earl Strange in the Peerage of Great Britain, which gave him an automatic seat in the House of Lords. He later served as Lord-Lieutenant of Perthshire from 1794 to 1830 and was sworn of the Privy Council in 1797. In 1800 he was made a Knight of the Thistle. In 1793 he was appointed Captain-General and Governor in Chief of the Isle of Man, his mother making over to him most of her rights in the Island.  He succeeded his mother in the barony of Strange in 1805. He was also Grand Master of the Antient Grand Lodge of England from 1775 until 1781 and again from 1791 until 1812.

During his control of the Blair Estate he planted over 20 million trees over an area of 16,000 acres, using cannon filled with seed to spread seed over the high hills. He earned himself the nickname "The Planting Duke".

He introduced Japanese Larch into Britain, planting the trees at Dunkeld, where they hybridized with the first European Larch in Britain, planted by his uncle, the second duke, and gave rise to the Dunkeld Larch. In 1796-97 he planted pine and larch around the Falls of Bruar as a tribute to the recently deceased Robert Burns, responding to his poem The Humble Petition of Bruar Water to the Noble Duke of Atholl (1787). The Duke wrote "Observations on Larch" in 1807 encouraging further its cultivation, which he practiced on a large scale.

Atholl died in September 1830, aged 75, and was succeeded by his eldest son, John. The Duchess of Atholl died in October 1842, aged 81. Athol, Nova Scotia is named after him.

Family
Atholl married the Honourable Jane Cathcart (24 May 1754 – 26 December 1790), daughter of Jane Cathcart and Charles Cathcart, 9th Lord Cathcart, on 26 December 1774. They had eight children:
 Lady Charlotte Murray (1775–1832) married 1st Sir John Menzies of Castle Menzies, 4th Baronet and 2nd Admiral Sir Adam Drummond KCH, 7th of Megginch (great-grandparents of John Drummond, 15th Baron Strange)
 John Murray, 5th Duke of Atholl (26 June 1778 – 14 September 1846)
 James Murray, 1st Baron Glenlyon (29 May 1782 – 12 October 1837); married Emily Frances Percy and had four children, including the 6th Duke.
 Lord Edward Murray (11 September 1783 – 19 March 1795).
 Lord Robert Murray (13 March 1785 – 5 February 1793).
 Lord Frederick Murray (13 October 1788 – 11 April 1789).
 Lady Amelia Sophia Murray
 Lady Elizabeth Murray

After his first wife's death in 1790 he married Marjory, daughter of James Forbes, 16th Lord Forbes, and Catherine Innes and widow of John Mackenzie, Lord MacLeod, on 11 March 1794. They had two children:

 Lady Catherine Murray (died 1796)
 Lord Charles Murray (1799 - August 1824); he died of disease at Gastouni, Peloponnese while contributing to the Greek War of Independence.

Ancestry

References

1755 births
1830 deaths
104
Knights of the Thistle
Lord-Lieutenants of Perthshire
Scottish representative peers
Peers of Great Britain created by George III
Grand Masters of the United Grand Lodge of England
Members of the Privy Council of Great Britain
Fellows of the Royal Society
John
Governors of the Isle of Man
18th-century Scottish people
19th-century Scottish people
People of Byzantine descent
Dukes of Rannoch
Barons Strange